Priscilla Gagné (born May 21, 1986) is a partially blind Canadian judoka. She won a silver medal at the 2020 Summer Paralympics.

On August 21, 2021, Gagné was announced as Canada's flagbearer during the 2020 Summer Paralympics opening ceremony.

Career 
She won the bronze medal at the 2015 Para Judo World Cup.

She is a double Parapan silver medalist and was the first Canadian female medalist in the IBSA World Championships.

References

External links
 
 

1986 births
Living people
People from Granby, Quebec
Sportspeople from Quebec
Paralympic judoka of Canada
Canadian female judoka
Judoka at the 2016 Summer Paralympics
Medalists at the 2015 Parapan American Games
Medalists at the 2019 Parapan American Games
20th-century Canadian women
21st-century Canadian women